Amsterdamse Sport Vereniging De Dijk are a Dutch amateur  association football club from the Amsterdam borough of Amsterdam-Noord, in the neighborhood of Schellingwoude. The club was founded on 1 June 1999 out of a fusion of two clubs, Rood Wit-A and ASV Schellingwoude. The club hold a Sunday team, competing in the Derde Divisie (formerly Topklasse).

History
Rood Wit-A were founded on 13 April 1921 as VVA (Voetbal Vereniging Augustinus) joining the Katholieke Voetbalbund (Catholic football union). The name of the club was then changed to RKVVA, following the fusion of the IVCB and the KNVB, in order to tell them apart from VVA who were already competing in the KNVB. In 1957 the club merged with the gymnastics and handball clubs SVA and VDO, as well as the table tennis club KK (Katholieke Kring), becoming an Omni sports club by the name of RKSV Rood Wit Amsterdam.

ASV Schellingwoude were founded on 23 July 1921 as VVS (Voetbal Vereniging Schellingwoude). The club competed in the NHVB at first, before joining the AVB, with both leagues being under the KNVB. A handball team was established as well during the club's 25th anniversary, and the name was subsequently changed to Amsterdamse Sportvereniging Schellingwoude.

On 1 June 1999 the two clubs merged. The new team colors became red-blue-white, with the new name referring to the Schellingwouderdijk upon which the team's ground Sportpark Schellingwoude was built. In 2011 the club's Sunday team won their third consecutive championship, when the team was promoted for three consecutive seasons from the Vierde Klasse to the Eerste Klasse, followed by promotion to the Hoofdklasse. In 2016 they won entry to the Derde Divisie after finishing second.

Team management
ASV De Dijk are the first football club in Amsterdam to have a completely separate Management Column for "Team Development", working exclusively on the team's position in society as a sports club. De Dijk is the first amateur football club to partner with the John Blankenstein Foundation. By partnering with Right to Play the club's youth teams play with the RtP print on the shirt, and a portion of the proceeds are donated to the cause of their charity.

Through active collaborative efforts, the team and its sponsors use the partnership as a means to promote team related activities, commonly in the name of teamwork and social responsibility.

Honours
Derde Divisie (Sunday clubs)
2016/17

Eerste Klasse (Sunday clubs)
2012/13

Tweede Klasse (Sunday clubs)
2010/11

Derde Klasse (Sunday clubs)
2009/10

Vierde Klasse (Sunday clubs)
2008/09

References

External links 
 ASV De Dijk - official website

Football clubs in the Netherlands
Football clubs in Amsterdam
1999 establishments in the Netherlands
Association football clubs established in 1999